Jubb may refer to:

People
Daniel Jubb (born 1984) British rocket scientist
David Jubb (born 1969) British theatre producer
Eric Jubb (born 1931) Canadian swimmer at the 1948 Summer Olympics
George Jubb (1717–1787) Anglican priest
Ken Jubb (1912—1993) English professional rugby league footballer
Paul Jubb (born 1999) English tennis player
Will Jubb (born 1996) English rugby league player

Geography
jubb (Arabic: جُبّ ) also spelled jeb, a kind of well in which stones have not been used in its construction
Jubb Yusuf (Arabic: جُب يوسف), also called 'Arab al-Suyyad, was a Palestinian village depopulated in the 1948 Arab–Israeli War
Jubb'adin (Arabic: جبعدين)  village in southern Syria, administratively part of the Rif Dimashq Governorate, located northeast of Damascus
Jubb al-Jarrah (Arabic: جب الجراح)  village in central Syria, administratively part of the Homs Governorate. 
Jubb al-Ghar (Arabic: جب الغار jubb al-ghār) Syrian village located in Shathah Nahiyah in Al-Suqaylabiyah District, Hama
Jubb Ramlah (Arabic: جب رملة) village in northwestern Syria, administratively part of the Hama Governorate
Jubb al-Shami (Arabic: جب الشامي)  hamlet east of Homs
Jubb al-Uthman (Arabic: جب العثمان) Syrian village located in Al-Hamraa Nahiyah in Hama District, Hama
Jubb al-Safa (Arabic: جب الصفا) village in southern Syria, administratively part of the Markaz Rif Dimashq District

See also
Jubb, play by Keith Waterhouse